Hacketville is a former settlement in Nevada County, California. Along with Spenceville and Wilsonville, Hacketville was established southwest of Rough and Ready during the 1865-1866 copper mining boom.

References

Former settlements in Nevada County, California
Former populated places in California